Comet 177P/Barnard, also known as Barnard 2, is a periodic comet with an orbital period of 119 years. It fits the classical definition of a Halley-type comet with (20 years < period < 200 years).

The comet, also designated P/2006 M3, was discovered by Edward Emerson Barnard on June 24, 1889, and was re-discovered after 116 years.  On July 19, 2006, 177P came within 0.36 AU of the Earth.  From late July through September 2006 it was brighter than expected at 8th magnitude in the constellations Hercules and then Draco. Perihelion was August 28, 2006.

Of Barnard's other two periodic comets, the first, D/1884 O1 (Barnard 1) was last seen on November 20, 1884, and is thought to have disintegrated. The last, 206P/Barnard-Boattini marked the beginning of a new era in cometary astronomy, as it was the first to be discovered by photography. It was a lost comet after 1892, until accidentally rediscovered on October 7, 2008, by Andrea Boattini.

References

External links 
 Orbital simulation from JPL (Java) / Ephemeris
 177P/Barnard – Kazuo Kinoshita (2011 Jan. 17)
 177P at Gary W. Kronk's Cometography

Periodic comets
Halley-type comets
177P
0177
Discoveries by Edward Emerson Barnard
18890624